David Middleton may refer to:
David Middleton (mariner) (died 1617), early English merchant of the East India Company
David Middleton (cricketer) (born 1965), English cricketer
Dave Middleton (1933–2007), American football wide receiver
David Middleton Greig (1864–1936), Scottish surgeon
David Stephen Middleton (born 1961), suspected serial killer known as The Cable Guy
David Middleton (civil servant), New Zealand chief executive of the Earthquake Commission (1993–2010)